Buffalo Soldier Draw (formerly Dead Nigger Draw and Dead Negro Draw) is a valley in Garza and Lynn counties, Texas, in the United States. When wet, the valley contains a stream which runs  until it reaches the Double Mountain Fork Brazos River.

It was called "Dead Nigger Draw" until 1963, when the then United States Secretary of the Interior Stewart Udall mandated that the word "Nigger" in geographic names on federal maps and other products be changed to "Negro". Both names probably commemorate the Buffalo Soldier tragedy of 1877. On April 9, 2020, the United States Board on Geographic Names approved Garza County Judge Lee Norman's request to rename Dead Negro Draw to Buffalo Soldier Draw.

See also
List of rivers of Texas
Place names considered unusual#Profane, humorous, and highly charged words

References

Rivers of Texas
Rivers of Garza County, Texas
Rivers of Lynn County, Texas
Valleys of Texas
Naming controversies